Lars Gustaf Westman (16 April 1934 – 16 January 2021) was a Swedish writer and journalist.

Biography
Westman was the grandson of architect Carl Westman and the artist Elin Westman. He was, for many years, a journalist at Stockholms-Tidningen and the magazine We. He was the author of many books, including The Outer Isles: Life in the Outer Seaboard of Stockholm Archipelago and Air pollution and vegetation around a sulphite mill at örnsköldsvik, North Sweden: pollutants and plant communities on exposed rocks. In 2012, he published the book Till Saltsjöbaden.  Other published books are På liv och död (2006), Om X-et och Saltsjöbaden, and the children's book Springtjuven – ett Stockholmsmysterium.

References

Swedish male non-fiction writers
1934 births
2021 deaths
20th-century Swedish male writers
20th-century Swedish non-fiction writers
21st-century Swedish male writers
21st-century Swedish non-fiction writers